Eleanor Wong may refer to:

 Eleanor Wong (musician), pianist and keyboardist from Hong Kong
 Eleanor Wong (playwright) (born 1962), writer and lawyer from Singapore